Founded in 1997, the Miller Center for Social Entrepreneurship, formerly known as the Center for Science, Technology, and Society, is one of three Centers of Distinction at Santa Clara University. The Centers embody the University's mission to unite students and faculty with Silicon Valley leaders to address significant public issues. The Miller Center accelerates global, innovation-based entrepreneurship in service to humanity. Its strategic focus is on poverty eradication through its three areas of work: The Global Social Benefit Institute, Impact Capital, and Education and Action Research.

References

https://www.scu.edu/centers/

External links
 http://www.scu.edu/MillerCenter

Santa Clara University Centers
1997 establishments in California